Richard Purtill (1931-2016) was an American philosopher and writer, and  Professor Emeritus of Philosophy at Western Washington University, Bellingham, Washington, US. He was a writer of fantasy and science fiction, critical non-fiction on the same genres, and various works on religion and philosophy. He is best known for his novels of the "Kaphtu" universe. He wrote as both Richard Purtill and Richard L. Purtill, a variant form of his name. He was active in professional writing circles, being a member of the Science Fiction and Fantasy Writers of America, the Authors Guild and the National Writers Union.

His book J.R.R.Tolkien: Myth, Morality and Religion won the 1987 Mythopoeic Scholarship Award for Inklings Studies.

Bibliography

Kaphtu Universe
The Kaphtu Trilogy
The Golden Gryphon Feather (1979)
The Stolen Goddess (1980)
The Mirror of Helen (1983)

Lost Tales Of Kaphtu
The Gryphon Seal (2005)
The Eleusinian Gate (2006)
Letter to Nausicaa (2008)

Other novels
Murdercon (1982)
The Parallel Man (1984)
Enchantment At Delphi (1986)

Short stories
"Others' Eyes" (1980)
"By the Dragon's Cave" (1984)
"Gorgonissa" (1985)
"Something in the Blood" (as by Richard L. Purtill) (1986)
"The Counterfeit Maiden" (1996)
"Grey Wolf's Tale" (1999)
"The Firebird's Feather, the King Horse, and Baba Yaga's Grandniece" (1999)

Non-fiction
Logic for Philosophers (1971)
Solutions to Odd-numbered Exercises to Accompany Logic for Philosophers (1971)
Lord of the Elves and Eldils: Fantasy and Philosophy in C. S. Lewis and J. R. R. Tolkien (1974)
Reason to Believe (1974)
Philosophically Speaking (1975)
Thinking About Ethics (1976)
Thinking About Religion: A Philosophical Introduction to Religion (1978)
Logic: Argument, Refutation, and Proof (1979)
C S Lewis' Case for the Christian Faith (as by Richard L. Purtill) (1981, rev. 2004)
J.R.R.Tolkien: Myth, Morality and Religion (1984)
Philosophical Questions: An Introductory Anthology (1984) (with Peter Kreeft and Michael H. MacDonald) (1984)
Moral Dilemmas (1985)
A Logical Introduction to Philosophy (1988)
Logical Thinking (1992)

References

External links 
Richard Purtill's official home page
Fantastic Fiction entry
File770 obituary

1931 births
2016 deaths
20th-century American male writers
20th-century American non-fiction writers
20th-century American novelists
20th-century American short story writers
21st-century American male writers
21st-century American non-fiction writers
21st-century American novelists
21st-century American short story writers
American Christian writers
American fantasy writers
American male non-fiction writers
American male novelists
American male short story writers
American philosophers
American science fiction writers
Novelists from Illinois
Novelists from Washington (state)
Philosophers of religion
Western Washington University faculty
Writers from Chicago
Educators from Bellingham, Washington